Kassaly Daouda (born 19 August 1983) is a Nigerien footballer who plays as a goalkeeper for Nigerian club Katsina United.

Career
Born in Dosso, Niger, Daouda began his career at Olympic FC de Niamey, and was first chosen for the youth national selection in 1996, then rising to the full national squad in 1998. In August 2002 he gained his first cap, and has been the starting goalkeeper with Niger ever since. Transitioning to goalkeeper for the full Olympic FC, Daouda's side was national league champion, then runners up in 1999. In 2001, Daouda joined rival Niamey club Sahel SC, and as their number one went on to win three national championships and two national cups. He moved to Cameroon club Cotonsport Garoua in 2006 has played in the 2007 CAF Champions League  On the back of his success at Cotonsport, Daouda was chosen Niger's Best Player of the Year in 2008.

On 4 February 2009, he moved from Cotonsport Garoua to Rapid Bucharest on loan, and in summer 2009 returned to Cotonsport Garoua.

In September 2012, Daouda signed for South African Premier Soccer League club Chippa United.

He remained starting keeper for the Niger national football team throughout their successful qualification for the 2012 African Cup of Nations, and the tournament itself, as well as for 2013 African Cup of Nations.

In December 2018, Daouda signed for Nigerian Professional Football League club Katsina United.

References

External links

Kassaly Daouda interview

1983 births
Living people
People from Dosso Region
Nigerien footballers
Niger youth international footballers
Niger international footballers
2012 Africa Cup of Nations players
2013 Africa Cup of Nations players
Association football goalkeepers
Olympic FC de Niamey players
Sahel SC players
Coton Sport FC de Garoua players
FC Rapid București players
Chippa United F.C. players
ASN Nigelec players
AS Mangasport players
Katsina United F.C. players
South African Premier Division players
Nigerien expatriate footballers
Expatriate footballers in Cameroon
Expatriate footballers in Romania
Expatriate soccer players in South Africa
Expatriate footballers in Gabon
Expatriate footballers in Nigeria
Nigerien expatriate sportspeople in Cameroon
Nigerien expatriates in Romania
Nigerien expatriate sportspeople in South Africa
Nigerien expatriate sportspeople in Gabon
Nigerien expatriate sportspeople in Nigeria